Neflumozide is a novel antipsychotic similar in structure to benperidol.

See also 
 Benperidol

References 

Benzoxazoles
Benzimidazoles
Piperidines
Fluoroarenes
Ureas